Lousa or Lousã may refer to the following places in Portugal:

 Lousa (Castelo Branco), a village in Castelo Branco Municipality
 Lousa (Loures), a village in Loures Municipality
 Lousa (Torre de Moncorvo), a village in Torre de Moncorvo Municipality
 Lousã, a town in Coimbra District
 Lousã Municipality, a municipality in Coimbra District
 Lousã (parish), a village in Coimbra District